National Passenger Services, d/b/a Stock Transportation, is a Canadian school bus operator based in Markham, Ontario.  The company provides student transportation and charter services for twenty-eight school districts in Ontario, Nova Scotia and Alberta.

Stock Transportation was founded in 1958 by Jeff and Jerry Stock.  In July 2002 Stock Transportation was acquired by National Express.  That year a number of acquisitions were made such as the purchase of Deluxe Coach Lines and Alouette Bus Lines of North Bay.

The Customer Service Center in North Bay services approximately 100 home to school bus routes.

Customers
 Nipissing Parry Sound Student Transportation Services
 Toronto District School Board
 Toronto Catholic District School Board
 Peel District School Board
 Dufferin-Peel Catholic District School Board
 Halifax Regional School Board
 Halton District School Board
 Halton Catholic District School Board
 Chignecto-Central Regional School Board
 Annapolis Valley Regional School Board
 Anglophone East School District
 Conseil des écoles publiques de l'Est de l'Ontario 
 Conseil des écoles catholiques du Centre-Est 
 Upper Canada District School Board
 Simcoe County District School Board
 York Region District School Board
 York Region Transit - Student Express routes

Operations
All of National Passenger Service's buses are equipped with Zonar GPS technology which enables their staff to observe real-time the position of all of their bus fleet.

Roster 
Corbeil/GMC minibus - GMC 2500 chassis
 Ford E350 Super Duty minibus
 Chevrolet minibus - 3500 chassis
 International 3800-T444E
 Freightliner FS-65
 Thomas Saf-T-Liner C2
 IC Corporation CE200
 Kia Carnival
 Dodge Grand Caravan

See also
 Durham School Services
 Bus companies in Ontario

References

External links
Stock Transportation website
National Express LLC website

Bus transport in Nova Scotia
Bus transport in Ontario
National Express companies
School bus operators